Newtownbutler First Fermanaghs is a Gaelic football club based in Newtownbutler, County Fermanagh, Northern Ireland. Founded in 1887, they are Fermanagh's oldest GAA club.

History
The club was founded on 13 November 1887 in Reilly's Hotel, Newtownbutler. Historically club names have varied from the Brehons, St. Aidans, Geraldines, St. Comhghalls and then back to the famous First Fermanagh's, a name, that Michael Cusack, the founder of the GAA, was said to have suggested himself.

The club's most recent senior championship success came in 2007.

Honours
 Fermanagh Senior Football Championship (9): 1934, 1940, 1944, 1953, 1959, 1964, 1988, 1997, 2007
 Fermanagh Intermediate Football Championship (1): 1972
 Fermanagh Junior Football Championship (6): 1938, 1950, 1992, 1996, 2016, 2022
 Fermanagh Senior Hurling Championship (1): 1937

References

External links
 Newtownbutler First Fermanaghs Official Website

Gaelic football clubs in County Fermanagh
Gaelic games clubs in County Fermanagh